West Lakes is a suburb of Adelaide, the state capital of South Australia, Australia. It lies within the City of Charles Sturt. It contains the Westfield West Lakes Shopping Centre, Woodlake Shopping Centre and West Lakes Golf Club. It contains Delfin Island, a residential island within the boating lake.

West Lakes has an irregular shape and shares borders with Port Adelaide, Queenstown, Royal Park, Seaton, Grange, Tennyson and West Lakes Shore.

Demographics 

West Lake's population in the 2001 census was 5,940. In 2011 it 5,730. It was 6,768 in the 2021 census.

History 
West Lakes was constructed on part of the River Torrens Wetlands, after the diverting of the Torrens out to Sea at West Beach was completed, by property developer Delfin, now Lend Lease Communities, from reclaimed land during the early 1970s. Development earthworks commenced in September 1970. West Lakes was officially opened on 18 March 1977 by the Hon Des Corcoran, MP, Deputy Premier and Minister of Marine. West Lakes Post Office opened in August 1975.

The suburb was home to Football Park, also known by its sponsored name of AAMI Stadium, which was a 51,240-seat sports stadium where Australian Football League (AFL) and South Australian National Football League (SANFL) games were played. Demolition was completed in 2019.

The suburb was home to a Douglas C-47 Skytrain military transport aircraft, owned by McDonald's and used as part of a play area for children's parties. The plane was removed in the late 1990s, and is now being restored privately.

Public transport 
, bus routes that go through West Lakes are 110, 112, 115, 117, 155, 157, 157X, 288, 371, 372, 376, AO18, H30, H30C, H30S, J7, J7M, J8, N30, X30, X30C, & X30S.

References

External links 
 West Lakes — Summary of historical information relevant to the dispersal of sludge from the South Australian Environment Protection Authority (EPA).
 West Lakes: You'll want to live here. Promotional film includes footage of the area pre-development, then South Australian Premier Don Dunstan and Deputy Premier Des Corcoran, aerial views of the land and coastal development, creation of the central lake, Football Park and the finished suburb. South Australian Film Corporation, Adelaide, 1974.

Suburbs of Adelaide